"Girls Around the World" is a song by American recording artist Lloyd. The song features rapper Lil Wayne and was written by Lloyd and Lil Wayne, along with Eric Barrier and William Griffin. The song was produced by his production team, Big Reese and Jasper Cameron, who also produced his breakthrough hit, "You", which also featured Lil Wayne. The song served as the lead single for Lloyd's third studio album Lessons in Love. "Girls Around the World" received positive to mixed reviews from critics, some of whom noted it as generic, and others named it as a top track from the album. It reached No. 64 on the Billboard Hot 100 and No. 13 on the Hot R&B/Hip-Hop Songs chart. The song samples the drum break from "Ashley's Roachclip" by the Soul Searchers, as well as interpolating Rakim's verse in "Paid in Full" by hip hop duo Eric B. & Rakim.

Background
The song first leaked on Lil Wayne's Da Drought is Over Pt. 5 mixtape on March 30, 2008. During an interview with British magazine Blues & Soul, Lloyd revealed that Girls Around the World would be the second single from the album. It was sent to U.S. radio stations on May 12, 2008.

Remixes and freestyles
The official remix, "Girls Around the World (We The Best Remix)", features DJ Khaled, The Game, T.I., Yung Joc, Rick Ross, Ace Hood, Young Dro, Pitbull and Busta Rhymes. There is also a radio edit version that features DJ Khaled, The Game, T.I., Yung Joc and Busta Rhymes. The remix also samples from "Paid in Full" by Eric B. & Rakim. There are no verses by Lloyd; he only sings the chorus. Another remix features a verse from R&B singer Trey Songz.
Chamillionaire released a freestyle of this song for his Mixtape Messiah 4 called "All Around the World". In the song, he sings an entire verse, along with rapping.

Music video
The music video of the song was shot in Miami, Florida, and directed by Hype Williams. The video premiered on June 4, 2008 on BET's 106 & Park. It was also made available on Yahoo! Music on June 9, 2008. Its outer space theme was thought to be influenced by Janet Jackson's "Feedback."

Charts

Weekly charts

Year-end charts

References

2007 songs
2008 singles
Lil Wayne songs
Lloyd (singer) songs
Music videos directed by Hype Williams
Songs written by Lil Wayne
Songs written by Lloyd (singer)